The Cuban National Army (in Spanish: Ejército Nacional de Cuba) from 1935 known as the Cuban Constitutional Army (in Spanish: Ejército Constitucional de Cuba) was the army of the Republic of Cuba from 1902 to 1959.

History 
The Cuban National Army was the army of the Republic of Cuba until 1959. It was dissolved in 1959 following the victory of the Rebel Army, the armed forces of the July 26 Movement led by Fidel Castro. Following the victory of the Cuban Revolution in 1959, this army was replaced by the current Cuban Revolutionary Armed Forces.

The National Army represented the main means of repression during the military dictatorship of General Fulgencio Batista who ruled Cuba from 1952 to 1959 until his regime was overthrown by Castro's revolutionary forces.

Armament 

 8 Marmon Herrington CTMS-1TBI 
 24 M3A1 Stuarts
 7 M4A3 (76) W HVSS General Sherman
 15 Comet (A34)

Aircraft 
 29 Republic Thunderbolt F-47D
 7 Piper PA-20 Pacer
 5 Piper PA-18-135 Super Cub
 8 Lockheed T-33 Shooting Star Land/lease
 16 Douglas B-26B & C Invader Land/Lease
 4 Piper PA-22-150 Tri Pacer
 3 Piper Pa-22-160 Tri Pacer
 1 Piper PA-23-160 Apache
 1 Aero Commander 560
 2 Bell 47G-2
 1 Douglas TB-26 Land/lease
 6 De Havilland Beavers DHC-2
 4 Curtiss Commandos C-46

References 

Military units and formations of World War II
Cuban Revolution
Military history of Cuba